Ajau Nanga is a settlement in Sarawak, Malaysia.

The primary school is called SK Nanga Ajau.

Neighbouring settlements include:

References

Populated places in Sarawak